The 2007 UEFA Regions' Cup was the fifth UEFA Regions' Cup. It was held in Bulgaria and won by the Lower Silesia team from Poland, which beat the host nation's South-East Region 2–1, after extra time, in the final.

Preliminary round 
The eight teams in the preliminary round were drawn into two groups of four, with the fixtures for each group being played in the same country. Group East's matches were played in Greece and those for Group West were played in Northern Ireland. The two group winners and the best runner-up advanced to the intermediary round.

Group East

Group West

Intermediary round 
The 29 teams which went straight through to the intermediary round were joined by Northern Ireland's Eastern Region, East Attica of Greece and the Russian Southern Federal District. The 32 teams were drawn into eight groups of four, with the following countries hosting each group's matches:
Group 1 – 
Group 2 – 
Group 3 – 
Group 4 – 
Group 5 – 
Group 6 – 
Group 7 – 
Group 8 – 
The winners of each group qualified for the final tournament.

Group 1

Group 2

Group 3

Group 4

Group 5

Group 6

Group 7

Group 8

Final tournament 
Bulgaria was chosen to host the final tournament, with matches being played 20 June to 26 June 2007.

Group stage 
The eight intermediary group winners were drawn into two groups of four, with the two group winners advancing to the final.

Group A

Group B

Final

See also 
UEFA Regions' Cup

References

External links
Official UEFA Regions' Cup site
RSSSF page for the 2007 UEFA Regions' Cup

2007
Regions' Cup
Football competitions in Bulgaria